Willie "Cie" Grant (born November 27, 1979) is a former American football linebacker in the National Football League for the New Orleans Saints. He played college football at Ohio State University. During the final fourth down play in the 2003 Fiesta Bowl, a blitzing Grant applied quick pressure on Miami quarterback Ken Dorsey, forcing an incompletion and clinching the BCS National Championship. He graduated from New Philadelphia High School in 1998.  While at NPHS he participated in numerous sports as well as performing with Delphian Chorale, the high school's select choir.

References

1979 births
Living people
Players of American football from Ohio
People from Dover, Ohio
American football linebackers
Ohio State Buckeyes football players
New Orleans Saints players